The 1953 SANFL Grand Final was an Australian rules football competition.   beat  67 to 60. It was West Torrens' final premiership and Grand Final appearance as a stand-alone team before merging with Woodville in 1990.

References 

SANFL Grand Finals
SANFL Grand Final, 1953